Alfred Townsend  (born 1864) was a Welsh international footballer. He was part of the Wales national football team between 1887 and 1893, playing 2 matches. He played his first match on 12 March 1887 against Ireland and his last match on 5 April 1893 against Ireland.

See also
 List of Wales international footballers (alphabetical)
 List of Wales international footballers born outside Wales

References

1864 births
Welsh footballers
Wales international footballers
Place of birth missing
Year of death missing
Association footballers not categorized by position